Femke Meines (born 11 May 2000) is a Dutch singer and actress. Meines began her career at age 12, when she represented the Netherlands in the Junior Eurovision Song Contest 2012, placing seventh. From 2016 to 2017, Meines portrayed Liz in the Disney Channel Netherlands & Flanders series Just Like Me!.

Discography

Albums
 Junior Songfestival '12

Singles
 "Tik tak tik" (Tick Tock Tick)
 "JSF Party"
 "Dan kies ik voor jou" (Then I'll choose you)
 "Kerst met jou" (Christmas with You)
 "Dat Zijn Wij" (That's Us)
 "Op grote schouders" (On Large Shoulders)
 "Geen zin" (I don't feel like it)
 "Unica"
 "Smelt" (Melt)
 "Nog een kus" (One More Kiss)
 "Just Like Me"
 "Wazig" (Misty)
 "Keppie"
 "Dichterbij" (Official Title Track of Dutch Movie "Engel")
 "Mooi Begint Van Binnen"

References

External links
 
 Femke Meines' website

2000 births
21st-century Dutch actresses
21st-century Dutch singers
Living people
Child pop musicians
Dutch child actresses
Dutch child singers
Dutch pop singers
Dutch television actresses
Junior Eurovision Song Contest entrants for the Netherlands
People from Harenkarspel